James Breck Perkins (November 4, 1847 – March 11, 1910) was an American historian, a United States congressman, and a writer.

He was born in St. Croix Falls, Wisconsin, and graduated from the University of Rochester, where he was a member of St. Anthony Hall, in 1867. He served as city attorney of Rochester, New York, from 1874 to 1878; was a member of the New York State Assembly (Monroe Co., 1st D.) in 1898; and served as a representative in Congress from 1901 until his death.

Recognized as the leading authority in the particular historical field to which he devoted himself, he was honored by membership in the National Institute of Arts and Letters. His writings include: 
France under Mazarin (1887)
France under Louis XV (1897)
Richelieu (1900), in the "Heroes of the Nations Series"
France in the American Revolution (1911)

He died in Washington, D.C.

See also
List of United States Congress members who died in office (1900–49)

References

External links

 James Breck Perkins, late a representative from New York, Memorial addresses delivered in the House of Representatives frontispiece 1911

1847 births
1910 deaths
Historians from New York (state)
University of Rochester alumni
Republican Party members of the New York State Assembly
Politicians from Rochester, New York
People from St. Croix Falls, Wisconsin
Writers from Rochester, New York
College Republican National Committee chairs
Republican Party members of the United States House of Representatives from New York (state)
19th-century American politicians
Historians from Wisconsin
Members of the American Academy of Arts and Letters